Zaprionus indianus, the African fig fly, is a species of vinegar fly in the family Drosophilidae.

The species has become widely distributed in tropical regions of the world, as well as southern Europe and the U.S.  Although the holotype was described from India, the species is considered to have originated from central Africa.

References

Further reading

External links

 
 

Drosophilidae
Insects described in 1970